Shanigaram Reservoir (Telugu:) also known as Shanigaram Cheruvu is a medium irrigation project constructed across the Shanigaram River, at Shanigaram Village, Siddipet  District, Telangana.

This is one of the oldest reservoir constructed in 1891 under Nizam rule. Project construction cost was 560 seers (504 kg) of gold.

As part of Sriram Sagar Stage-II work, this reservoir will be filled by lift canal from Thotapally Reservoir in which water carried from Mid Manair through MMD Right Canal. Both Reservoirs and MMD Right Canal construction is in progress,; it is expected to finish by end of 2015.

See also

 Sriram Sagar Project
 Lower Manair Dam
 Mid Manair Dam
 Upper Manair Dam
 Sripada Yellampalli project
 Nizam Sagar
 Kaddam Project
 Pranahita Chevella
 Alisagar lift irrigation scheme
 Sri Komaram Bheem Project
 Icchampally Project
 Kaleshwaram Project

References

External links
 India-wris.nrsc.gov.in
 Irrigation.cgg.gov.in
 Sakti.in

Dams on the Godavari River
Dams in Telangana
Reservoirs in India
Karimnagar district
Inter-state disputes in India
Irrigation in Telangana
Godavari basin